The 2020–21 Armenian Cup was the 30th edition of the football competition in Armenia. The competition began on 18 September 2020 and ended on 15 May 2021. The winners of the competition earned a place in the first qualifying round of the 2021–22 UEFA Europa Conference League.

Noah were the defending champions of the cup after defeating Ararat-Armenia in the previous season's final on penalties.

Gandzasar Kapan announced that they were withdrawing from the Armenian Cup due to financial difficulties related to the COVID-19 pandemic in Armenia and the 2020 Nagorno-Karabakh conflict.

Teams

First round

Quarterfinals

Semi–finals

Final

Scorers

6 goals:
 Mory Kone - Ararat Yerevan

4 goals:
 Aleksandar Glišić - Alashkert

2 goals:

 David Davidyan - Alashkert
 Edgar Malakyan - Ararat Yerevan
 David Khurtsidze - Ararat Yerevan
 Uroš Nenadović - Ararat Yerevan
 Marko Prljević - Ararat Yerevan
 Davit Minasyan - Gandzasar Kapan
 Petros Avetisyan - Noah
 Charles Ikechukwu - West Armenia
 Mihran Manasyan - Van/Alashkert

1 goals:

 Gagik Daghbashyan - Alashkert
 Rumyan Hovsepyan - Alashkert
 Bryan - Alashkert
 Wangu Gome - Alashkert
 Sunday Ingbede - Alashkert
 Nikita Tankov - Alashkert
 Pape Camara - Alashkert
 Davit Terteryan - Ararat-Armenia
 Zakaria Sanogo - Ararat-Armenia
 Yoan Gouffran - Ararat-Armenia
 Zaven Badoyan - Ararat Yerevan
 Aghvan Papikyan - Ararat Yerevan
 Dimitrije Pobulić - Ararat Yerevan
 Sergey Mkrtchyan - BKMA Yerevan
 Hayk Ghevondyan - BKMA Yerevan
 Zhirayr Shaghoyan - BKMA Yerevan
 Claudir - Lori
 Pavel Osipov - Lori
 Raymond Gyasi - Noah
 Helistano Manga - Noah
 Vladimir Azarov - Noah
 Denys Dedechko - Noah
 Anton Kobyalko - Pyunik
 Mher Sahakyan - Sevan
 Aram Muradyan - Shirak
 Jonel Désiré - Urartu
 Dmitry Guz - Urartu
 Igor Paderin - Urartu
 Aleksandr Radchenko - Urartu
 Sargis Baloyan - West Armenia
 Roman Dzhigkayev - West Armenia
 Evgeniy Kasyanov - West Armenia
 Sergei Orlov - West Armenia
 Edgar Movsesyan - Van
 Stanislav Yefimov - Van

See also
 2020–21 Armenian Premier League

References

External links
 soccerway.com

Armenian Cup seasons
Armenian Cup
Cup